Corinto is a town, with a population of 18,552 (2021 estimate), on the northwest Pacific coast of Nicaragua in the province of Chinandega. The municipality was founded in 1863.

History

Early years
The town of Corinto was founded in 1849. It first came into prominence as a port in 1863, due to its spacious and sheltered harbour. It superseded El Realejo, which was from 1550 to 1850 the principal seaport of Nicaragua but became partly filled with sandbanks.

British occupation
When Nicaragua refused to pay Britain an indemnity for the annexation of the Mosquito Reserve, the British responded by occupying the Nicaraguan Pacific port of Corinto on 27 April 1895. Eventually the British left after being paid indemnities by the Nicaraguan government.

United States intervention 

On May 2, 1896, U.S. Marines landed in Corinto to protect American interests during political unrest.

In 1909, President Theodore Roosevelt appointed the African-American writer James Weldon Johnson U.S. Consul to Corinto.

On January 25, 1922, the USS Galveston landed a detachment of U.S. Marines at Corinto, to reinforce the Managua legation guard during a period of political tension.

While supporting the Contra war against the Sandinista government in the 1980s, U.S. Forces mined the Port of Corinto. On October 10, 1983, an attack destroyed  of fuel. It is believed that this attack was directed by the CIA and carried out by U.S. Navy Seals.

Economy 
Corinto was a railroad terminus and is Nicaragua's largest and only Pacific port for the import and export of goods. It has a container terminal and is able to manage a wide variety of cargo: liquid, bulk, containers, cars, etc.

International relations

Twin towns – Sister cities
Corinto is twinned with:
 Bremen, Germany
 Cologne, Germany
 Liverpool, United Kingdom
 Portland, Oregon, United States

See also
List of lighthouses in Nicaragua

References

External links

 http://corinto.sozac.com/
 https://web.archive.org/web/20120313061011/http://corintounido.com/
 https://web.archive.org/web/20061021232053/http://www.epn.com.ni/corinto.php
 http://www.portalcorinto.com (informational site in Spanish).
 Corinto Photos
 https://www.facebook.com/groups/CorintoChinandegaOfficial/
 Picture of Isla El Cardon Lighthouse

Municipalities of the Chinandega Department
Lighthouses in Nicaragua